Sai Baba Temple is a Hindu temple of Sai Baba located in Dilsukhnagar, Hyderabad, India. It is one of the most popular temples in Hyderabad.

History
The temple has become popular since the 1990s, especially on Thursdays.

Everyday Marathi Pooja and Aarati are performed in the mornings and evenings, for which huge turn out of devotees is witnessed.

Terrorist bombings
The first bombing at the temple took place in November 2002. A bomb exploded in November 2002 injuring seven people. It was initially a target in 2013 Hyderabad blasts, but later withdrew because of the security at the temple.

References

Hindu temples in Hyderabad, India
Sai Baba of Shirdi